The Peruvian Academy of Language is an association of academics and experts on the use of the Spanish language in Peru.
It was founded in Lima on May 5, 1887.  Its first elected president was Francisco García Calderón. The second president was Ricardo Palma.
It is a member of the Association of Spanish Language Academies.

Current members 

 Sr. D. Estuardo Núñez
 Sr. D. Francisco Miró Quesada Cantuarias
 Sra. D.ª Martha Hildebrandt
 Sr. D. Mario Vargas Llosa
 Sr. D. Carlos Germán Belli
 Sr. D. José A. de la Puente Candamo
 Sr. D. Enrique Carrión Ordóñez
 Sr. D. José Luis Rivarola
 Sr. D. Manuel Pantigoso Pecero
 Sr. D. Rodolfo Cerrón Palomino
 Sr. D. Jorge Puccinelli Converso
 Sr. D. Gustavo Gutiérrez
 Sr. D. Fernando de Trazegnies Granda
 Sr. D. Fernando de Szyszlo
 Sr. D. José León Herrera
 Sr. D. Marco Martos Carrera - President of the Academy from 2006 to 2014 and since 2018.
 Sr. D. Ricardo González Vigil
 Sr. D. Edgardo Rivera Martínez
 Sr. D. Ricardo Silva Santisteban - President of the Academy from 2014 to 2017.
 Sr. D. Ismael Pinto Vargas
 Sr. D. Eduardo Francisco Hopkins Rodríguez
 Sr. D. Salomón Lerner Febres
 Sr. D. Luis Alberto Ratto
 Sr. D. Alberto Varillas Montenegro
 Sr. D. Camilo Rubén Fernández Cozman

See also
Peruvian literature
 

Spanish language academies
Peruvian culture
Organizations established in 1887
1887 establishments in South America